Alexander Farnese (27 August 1545 – 3 December 1592) was an Italian noble and condottiero and later a general of the Spanish army, who was Duke of Parma, Piacenza and Castro from 1586 to 1592, as well as Governor of the Spanish Netherlands from 1578 to 1592. Thanks to a steady influx of troops from Spain, during 1581–1587 Farnese captured more than thirty towns in the south (now Belgium) and returned them to the control of Catholic Spain. During the French Wars of Religion he relieved Paris for the Catholics. His talents as a field commander, strategist and organizer earned him the regard of his contemporaries and military historians as the first captain of his age.

Early life: 1545-1577 

Alessandro, born 27 August 1545, was the son of Duke Ottavio Farnese of Parma (a grandson of Pope Paul III) and Margaret of Austria (an illegitimate daughter of the king of Spain, Emperor Charles V). He had a twin brother, Carlo, who died in Rome on 7 October 1549. He and his mother, the half-sister of Philip II of Spain and Don Juan, left Rome for Parma in 1550. When Margaret was appointed Governor of the Netherlands, Alessandro accompanied her to Brussels in 1556 and was delivered to Philip II to ensure the loyalty of the Farnese. While in the King's custody, he visited the English royal court and then went to Spain to be raised and educated with his cousin, the ill-fated Don Carlos and his half-uncle, Don Juan, both of whom were about the same age as himself.

In 1565 his marriage with Maria of Portugal, which ended his stint as Philip II's hostage, was celebrated in Brussels with great splendour. He commanded three galleys during the Battle of Lepanto (1571) and the subsequent campaigns against the Turks. It was seven years before he again had the opportunity to display his great military talents. During that time the provinces of the Netherlands had revolted against Spanish rule. Don Juan, who had been sent as governor-general to restore order, found difficulties in dealing with William the Silent, who had succeeded in uniting all the provinces in common resistance to King Philip II.

Governor-General of the Netherlands 

In the autumn of 1577 shortly after his wife's death, Farnese led Spanish reinforcements from Italy along the Spanish Road to join Don Juan, and it was his able strategy and prompt decision at a critical moment that decisively won the Battle of Gembloux in early 1578. Shortly thereafter was the Siege of Zichem (Dutch) where the garrison was put to the sword and the town was sacked. This incident is considered to be the biggest stain on Farnese’s otherwise chivalrous career. Next was the five-day Siege of Nivelles (Dutch) (French) in March of 1578. The example of Zichem encouraged the citizens to capitulate so quickly. That summer, Farnese managed to prevent the defeat at the Battle of Rijmenam from being decisive.

In October 1578, Don Juan, whose health had broken down, died. Phillip II appointed Farnese to take his place as Captain-General of the Army of Flanders and appointed his mother Margaret as Governor-General. This was unacceptable to Alexander; he demanded to be both Captain-General and Governor-General or he would resign thus leaving military matters entirely in Margaret's hands. Philip eventually capitulated and after four years, Margaret returned to Parma.

Upon Don Juan's death, Farnese was confronted with a difficult situation. Perceiving that his opponents were divided between Catholic and Protestant, Fleming and Walloon, he skillfully worked to exploit these divisions. By this means, he regained the allegiance of the Walloon provinces for the king. Through the treaty of Arras, January 1579, he secured the support of the "Malcontents" (the Catholic nobles of the south) for the royal cause. The rebels in the seven northern provinces then formed the Union of Utrecht, formally abjuring Phillip's rule and pledging to fight to the end.

As soon as he had secured a base of operations in Hainaut and Artois, Farnese set himself in earnest to the task of reconquering Brabant and Flanders by force of arms, beginning with Maastricht. Farnese commenced the Siege of Maastricht on 12 March 1579. He ordered his troops to sap the walls. The inhabitants of Maastricht were also digging to reach the Spanish tunnels. Deep underground the fighting continued, hundreds of Spanish soldiers died as boiling oil was poured into their tunnels. Others died because of a lack of oxygen when the Dutch defenders ignited fires within them. Another 500 Spanish soldiers died when a mine, which they planned to use to blow up the wall, exploded prematurely.

On the night of 29 June, Farnese's men managed to get into the city while the exhausted defenders were asleep. Since the city had not surrendered after the walls had been breached, the 16th-century law of war gave the victors the right to loot the conquered city. The Spanish looted the city for three days during which time many civilians lost their lives. The looting was particularly violent, perhaps because Farnese was in bed with fever during those three days.

In adherence to the treaty of Arras, the Spanish troops were expelled from the country so Alexander only had the Walloon troops available for the Siege of Tournai (Dutch). The difficulties encountered with the ragtag troops during that siege helped convince the Walloon lords to allow for the return of foreign, more importantly Spanish troops.

In a war composed mostly of sieges rather than battles, Parma proved his mettle. His strategy was to offer generous terms for surrender: there would be no massacres or looting; historic urban privileges were retained; there was a full pardon and amnesty; return to the Catholic Church would be gradual.

The apex of Alexander Farnese's career was when he laid siege to the great seaport of Antwerp. The town was open to the sea, strongly fortified, and defended with resolute determination and courage by its citizens. The latter were led by the famous Marnix van St. Aldegonde and assisted by an ingenious Italian engineer named Federigo Giambelli. The siege began in 1584 and called forth all of Farnese's military genius. He cut off all access to Antwerp from the sea by constructing a bridge of boats across the Scheldt from Calloo to Oordam, in spite of the desperate efforts of the besieged townspeople. The terms offered included the clause that all Protestants had to leave the city within four years. This disciplined capture and occupation of the town should not be confused with the bloody events of the Spanish Fury on 4 November 1576. Farnese avoided the mistakes of his predecessors including Don Luis de Requesens. With the Fall of Antwerp, and with Mechelen and Brussels already in the hands of Farnese, the whole of the southern Netherlands was once more placed under the authority of Philip II. Both Holland and Zeeland, whose geographical position made them unassailable except by water, were hard-pressed to retain the territory.

Alexander pressed operations in the regions of the Meuse and the Rhine so as to maintain trade with Germany and prepare a gateway for winning Holland and Zeeland. Unfortunately for the prince, Phillip II's parsimonious disbursement of money started having its effect in the campaigns following Antwerp's conquest. The first notable Spanish defeat under Farnese's command came at his first attempt to take control of Grave. In December of 1585, with the growing food shortage, Farnese marched his troops towards the Rhine and Meuse regions so as to spare Flanders, Brabant and the Waloon provinces the burden of feeding them and, while there, undertake operations to secure trade along those rivers. That winter was nearly disastrous for Farnese's army were it not for the "Miracle of Empel". Nevertheless, by 7 June the Siege of Grave (1586) was a fait accompli. On the other hand, fortunately for Alexander, who became Duke upon his father's death in 1586, the poorly supplied English forces, sent by Elizabeth I, were duly defeated by the Duke's forces. The Siege of Sluis (1587) was necessary, so as to secure a safe harbour for the Armada ships, and was successful.

Spanish Armada 

When Alexander Farnese became Duke of Parma through the death of his father; he never ruled, instead naming his son Ranuccio as regent. He applied for leave to visit his paternal territory but Philip II would not grant it as there were no suitable candidates in the Netherlands to replace him. However, while retaining him in his command at the head of a formidable army, the king would not give his sanction to his great general's desire to use it for the conquest of England, at the time a supporter of the rebels.

Although Farnese was not enthusiastic about the project, in November 1583, he initially believed it possible to successfully invade England from the Netherlands with a force of 30,000 troops relying mainly on the hope of a native Catholic insurrection, but emphasized to Philip II that it was imperative for three conditions to be met: the main condition was the maintenance of absolute secrecy; second, secure the possession and defence of the Dutch provinces; third, keep the French from interfering either by way of a peace agreement or by sowing division amongst the Huguenots and Catholics. Philip overruled him and solicited the Marquis of Santa Cruz to draft and present an invasion plan which evolved to become the Enterprise of England, more commonly known as the Spanish Armada. As part of the general campaign preparations, Farnese moved against Ostend and Sluis, the latter of which would be taken on August 1587.

The plan was that Parma's troops would cross the channel in barges, protected by the Armada. Santa Cruz was appointed commander of the armada but died in early 1588 and command of the armada was given to the incompetent Duke of Medina Sidonia. The Armada entered the English Channel in the summer of that year but poor communication between Parma and the Armada's commander made effective coordination difficult. Alexander informed Philip II that his barges were nothing more than flat-bottomed transport vessels, not warships, and he was being blockaded by English ships thus preventing him from leaving Nieuwpoort and Dunkirk. Farnese expected the Armada to clear a passage for his barges. Parma's troops were also threatened by the presence of Dutch forces in flyboats, who hoped to destroy the barges and drown Parma's army at sea. In contrast, Medina Sedonia expected Parma to fight his way out from the ports and meet him in the channel. The English attack on the Armada in the Battle of Gravelines (1588), followed by an unfavourable change in wind direction, made link-up impossible.

After the failure of the Armada, fortune seems to have abandoned the Duke of Parma. Farnese broke up his camp in Dunkirk in September and sent the Marquis de Renty to the island of Tholen in preparation to besiege the predominately English garrison at Bergen Op Zoom. Renty did not succeed in capturing Tholen, blaming bad weather, whereupon Farnese expressed that he should have led the expedition personally. Nevertheless, on 19 September 1588, Alexander set out from Bruges with his army to besiege Bergen Op Zoom. After a six-week siege, with winter approaching, Parma abandoned the enterprise and withdrew to Brussels, sending his troops into winter quarters.

Alexander's final major victory in the Netherlands was Geertruidenberg, a strategic gateway to Holland. The English garrison there was in full revolt for lack of pay. An English representative offered the city to Parma where it was ultimately delivered to him on 9 April 1589.

French Wars of Religion 
The Duke of Parma started feeling the first effects of oedema after the failed siege of Bergen op Zoom. He had to go to the town of Spa to treat his illness for nearly six months. During this time, the Old Tercio of Lombardy had mutinied and Farnese ordered that it be dissolved. Following this incident, Alexander's lieutenants suffered defeats in Friesland and Rheinberg.

First Expedition into France
Farnese intended to turn his attention back to the northern Netherlands, where the Dutch rebels had regrouped, but on the night of August 1–2, 1589, Henry III of France was assassinated, and Farnese was ordered into France, in support of the Duke of Mayenne and the Catholic opposition to Protestant Henri de Navarre known also as the "Béarnaise". This enabled the Dutch rebels to regain their momentum, which had been in ever deeper trouble since 1576. Parma had warned Philip II that the French incursion would endanger the gains made in the Netherlands and stated he would not accept responsibility for the losses or failures resulting from not heeding his advice.

Parma left Brussels on 6 August 1590 and ultimately arrived at Guise on 15 August. In late August, he moved to relieve Paris from the lengthy siege it had been placed under by Huguenots and Royalists loyal to Henry IV. Farnese's main goal was simply to resupply Paris by raising the blockade, not obliterating Henry's army. When Henry learned of the approach of Mayenne and Farnese, he broke camp to actively engage in battle. Parma had no intention of engaging in combat. He determined that capturing the fort at Lagny-sur-Marne would ensure traffic was maintained along the river Marne which was still in the hands of the Catholic League. At dawn on 5 September, Lagny was bombarded then stormed by Spanish troops who put its 800-man garrison to the sword, all within sight of Henri's camp, a mere 12km away. The latter abandoned the siege of Paris two days later but made one last "Hail Mary" attempt on 8-9 September which failed. With the course of the Marne completely open to traffic, supplies flowed into Paris for the next several days.

Keeping Paris supplied required the influx of victuals from multiple sources but most of Henri's forces occupied the areas along the Seine and Yonne rivers so Parma decided to clear the Corbeil-Essonnes to restore traffic on the Seine. The siege began on 22 September and by 16 October, the town was taken. Its garrison was put to the sword and the town was thoroughly sacked. With the siege of Paris lifted and its supply routes secured, Farnese took the road on November 3 back to the Netherlands, where Maurice of Nassau had gone on the offensive. Alexander's withdraw was not an easy one. He had thousands of men, wagons and horses to move during foul weather with the Béarnaise harassing him the entire way. Anticipating these difficulties, the Duke arranged his columns in such a way that Henri could not rout him. Twenty days into the march, on 25 November near Amiens, Henri with his cavalry boldly charged Farnese's column only to himself be routed beyond the river Aisne and getting wounded during the retreat. One final unsuccessful skirmish took place on 29 November where Henri was within a few hundred paces of Farnese.

Parma and Mayenne parted ways at Guise and Alexander arrived in Brussels on 4 December 1590.

Maurice of Nassau's Offensive
Alexander Farnese had appointed Peter Ernst von Mansfeld as acting Governor-General while he was in France. Days after Farnese's departure for France, Mansfeld and Colonel Francisco Verdugo, operating in Friesland, began lamenting to Philip II about the lack of money, supplies, and troop mutinies, all the things Farnese had been complaining about for the past several years. By the time Farnese had returned, Maurice had regained Steenbergen, Roosendaal, Oosterhout, Turnhout, and Westerlo. Farnese's absence brought with it a reduction in military activity on the part of the Spanish thus allowing the Dutch some time to reflect on what policies they needed to adopt that would be most effective against their enemy. This was the beginning of the Dutch Military Reforms which finally allowed them to have an even footing against the Spanish; Alexander had finally met his match in Maurice.

Second Expedition into France
On the night of 24 July 1591, just days after engaging in the siege of Knodsenburg, Alexander Farnese received orders from Philip II to drop everything and go back to France to aid the Catholic League. Realizing the difficulties of capturing this fort, he was actually relieved to be able to honourably abandon this enterprise engaged under bad auspices. Before he could even consider another expedition to aid the League, he needed to resume his treatments at Spa whence he arrived on August 1 with his son Ranuccio. In mid-November, Alexander drafted instructions for the interim Governor-General, Mansfeld again, in addition to putting measures in place for the defence of the Netherlands while he was away. By the end of November, the Duke was in Valenciennes where he mustered his troops. Towards the middle of January 1592, Parma had rendezvoused with Mayenne and made preparations to rescue Rouen from Henri.

Before heading to Rouen, Farnese made the strategic decision to capture Neufchâtel-en-Bray. This would keep supply lines open. Finally, on April 20, Parma arrived a few miles from Rouen where he was met by 50 cavalry sent by Villars. They informed him that Henri had lifted the siege and withdrew in the direction of Pont-de-l'Arche to entrench there.; Rouen was saved. Rather than follow Farnese's advice and attack Henri's camp and destroy his forces, the League’s leaders chose to capture Caudebec-en-Caux where he was subsequently wounded by a musket shot in the right forearm during the siege whilst reconnoitring the town. The wound undermined his already precarious health even more and he was forced to call his son Ranuccio to take command of the troops. Henri saw therein an opportunity to avenge the loss of Rouen. Rather than risk a full attack against the League's forces, he took a page from Farnese's book and decided to cut off all supply routes and starve them. The League's army abandoned Caudebec for Yvetot. The situation was worse than at Caudebec, all the while, Farnese was seriously ill and mostly bed-ridden yet still sharp in mind. The Duke of Parma finally devised a plan to clandestinely cross the Seine in boats leaving just enough men to make Henri believe the entire army was encamped. The Catholic army was across the river and long gone by the time Henri learned of it, literally right under his nose. After returning to the Netherlands, Alexander received a letter from Pope Clement VIII on June 28 congratulating him “for rescuing the Catholic Army.” Farnese quickly made his way back to Spa for yet more treatments.

Death

Alexander Farnese's Removal from Office
Ever since the failed armada campaign against England, Spanish agents and courtiers in Philip II's court who were jealous of Farnese's success had been engaged in a malicious campaign to discredit the Duke of Parma in the eyes of the king. After Farnese's return from his second French campaign, the king, who had always favoured his nephew Alexander, allowed these complaints and accusations to influence his opinion. This change in sentiment caused the king to order the duke removed from his post in the Netherlands. The sovereign drafted a recall letter on 20 February 1592, while Farnese was marching on Rouen, and tasked Juan Pacheco de Toledo, II marqués de Cerralbo, to personally deliver it to the duke upon his return to Flanders. Cerrablo died along the way.  The king then assigned Pedro Henriquez de Acevedo, Count of Fuentes to carry out this mission. The date of the recall letter was changed to 28 June 1592. Given Philip II's nature toward duplicitous intrigue, the king reassured Farnese that everything was fine, all the while arranging for his recall from Flanders. The duke knew nothing about these machinations and by October was feeling well enough to return to Brussels only to learn that he was ordered to aid the League yet again.

Final Expedition into France
Fully aware of his state of health, the Duke of Parma, nevertheless, prepared for this campaign by arranging for loans and sumptuous quarters in Paris so as to give the appearance of a powerful representative of the King of Spain. He had written his last will and testament, repeatedly went to confession and took holy communion, and sent his son back to Parma so that, upon his death, the Farnesian States would not be deprived of a ruler.

The duke left Brussels on November 11 arriving in Arras where, on 2 December 1592, he died at the age of 47.

His mortal remains were dressed in a Capuchin habit, moved to Parma and buried in the Capuchin church, next to his wife's tomb. Later, their mortal remains were moved to the crypt of the Basilica of the Madonna della Steccata, where they are still found today. His death spared him from seeing the provision by which he was relieved of the post of Governor-General.

In January 2020, the Duke's remains were exhumed in a bid to clarify the circumstances of his death which were ultimately determined to be pneumonia.

Issue 

From his marriage with Infanta Maria of Portugal, also known as Maria of Guimarães, he had three children:

Illegitimate issue 

Circulating around the internet on various websites are claims that Alessandro Farnese had (so far identified) two lovers: Françoise de Renty (a.k.a., La Belle Franchine), a young Flemish noblewoman, and Catherine de Roquoi, also a Flemish noblewoman and member of the House of Roquoi, with whom he allegedly had an illegitimate daughter; Isabella Margherita Farnese (b. 1578 in Luxembourg - d. 1610 in Lisbon), married in 1592 to João de Menezes (1550-1604). The sources cited for the claim of an illegitimate child are a privately maintained genealogy website [Alessandro Farnese: family tree by Henri Frebault, (https://gw.geneanet.org.frebault)] and a European history website kleio.org. Neither site states the origin or source of their information meaning the claim cannot be verified, let alone validated.

What can be verified is Alessandro Farnese indeed had an affair with Françoise de Renty, known as the "belle Franceline", confirmed by an unpublished letter of instruction from Parma, contained in the manuscript at the Bibliotecca Nazionale di Napoli, Brancacciani F1, ff. 68-91v, to Pietro Caetani, on his way to serve Alessandro Farnese in the Netherlands, on how he should behave with her: Ama il Principe una Signora di qualità e fa piacere che da coloro che stimano il favor suo ella che sia corteggiata e servita… [The Prince loves a lady of quality and is pleased when she is courted and served by those who esteem his favour…] Although there is nothing to say with certainty about children from this relationship, according to Bertini, Farnese arranged for, and gave incentives to, Count Jean-Charles de Gavre, a nobleman in Alessandro’s household, to marry Françoise in 1586. Considering that the couple's first child, Marie-Alexandrine-Françoise de Gavre, was born soon afterwards in 1587, that her name (Alexandrine) is not found amongst either parent’s ancestors, and the influence Françoise had over Farnese, it is quite possible that he was the child's biological father.

Gallery

References

Bibliography

External links 

1545 births
1592 deaths
Governors of the Habsburg Netherlands
Spanish generals
Parma
Alessandro
Knights of the Golden Fleece
Alessandro
Italian people of Spanish descent
Nobility from Rome
People of the Anglo-Spanish War (1585–1604)
Burials at the Sanctuary of Santa Maria della Steccata
16th-century Roman Catholics
Italian Roman Catholics
Italian people of German descent
Military personnel from Rome
People of the French Wars of Religion